Barbara Weeks is the name of:

Barbara Weeks (film actress) (1913-2003), American film actress
Barbara Weeks (radio actress) (1906-1954), American radio actress